Sir Frederick William Alpin Gordon Haultain (November 25, 1857 – January 30, 1942) was a lawyer and a long-serving Canadian politician and judge. His career in provincial and territorial legislatures stretched into four decades. He served as the first premier of the Northwest Territories from 1897 to 1905 as is recognized as having a significant contribution towards the creation of the provinces of Alberta and Saskatchewan. From 1905 on he served as Leader of the Official Opposition in Saskatchewan as well as Leader of the Provincial Rights Party. His legislative career ended when he was appointed to the judiciary in 1912.

Early life

He was born in Woolwich, England in 1857, the son of Frederick W. Haultain (1821–1882) and Lucinde Helen Gordon (1828–1915), and came to Peterborough, Canada West, with his family in 1860. He grew up in Peterborough and Montreal, where he was educated at the High School of Montreal, later receiving a Bachelor of Arts from the University of Toronto. He later studied law at Osgoode Hall and was called to the bar in Ontario in 1882 and in the North-West Territories in 1884.

Northwest Territories politics

In 1884, Haultain opened a law practice in Fort Macleod. He also served as Crown Prosecutor there for several years, and also was an editor for newspapers in Fort Macleod and Lethbridge. Haultain was first elected to the Legislative Assembly of the Northwest Territories in a by-election held on September 5, 1887. He defeated Charles Conybeare by a large margin. Representing the electoral district of Macleod in the North-West Territories Council from 1887 to 1888. Haultain would win his next five elections by acclamation.

The editor of the Calgary Herald once wrote of him saying that "He is a man of academic training and large, clear perception; straightforward and manly even towards his enemies. In some respects, he is the most finished debater ever heard on a Western platform, arraying his Facts in crisp, clear-cut sentences, and then pressing home his argument with logic and Force?"

Premier
Hault was appointed premier of the Northwest Territories on October 7, 1897. Haultain also served as Attorney General and Commissioner of Education. As premier, Haultain led negotiations for the granting of provincial status. He argued for Alberta and Saskatchewan to be admitted as a single province named Buffalo, and wanted the new province to be governed by non-partisan governments. The federal Liberal government of Sir Wilfrid Laurier, however, decided that such a province would challenge the power of Ontario, and Quebec. Instead wanting to carve up the province to create, Alberta and Saskatchewan, in 1905.

Frustrated in negotiations with the federal Liberal government, Haultain became increasingly identified with the Conservative Party and campaigned for it in the 1904 federal election. Laurier's Liberals were re-elected.

Saskatchewan politics

Haultain led the Provincial Rights Party in the 1905 Saskatchewan provincial election, which was won by the Liberal Party of Saskatchewan. From 1905 to 1912, Haultain sat in the Legislative Assembly of Saskatchewan as leader of the Opposition.

Later life

In 1912, the newly elected Conservative federal government of Sir Robert Borden made Haultain Chief Justice of Saskatchewan's superior court. Haultain was knighted in 1916. The next year, he became Chief Justice of the Saskatchewan Court of Appeal, a position that he held until his retirement in 1938.

Haultain died on January 30, 1942, at Montreal.

References

Bibliography

Further reading

External links
Frederick Haultain biography

1857 births
1942 deaths
Canadian Anglicans
Canadian Knights Bachelor
Chancellors of the University of Saskatchewan
English emigrants to pre-Confederation Ontario
High School of Montreal alumni
Northwest Territories Liberal-Conservative Party MLAs
People from Woolwich
Premiers of the Northwest Territories
Members of the Legislative Assembly of the Northwest Territories
Lawyers in Saskatchewan
Judges in Saskatchewan
University of Toronto alumni
Pre-Confederation Saskatchewan people
Saskatchewan Provincial Rights Party MLAs
Persons of National Historic Significance (Canada)
Progressive Conservative Party of Saskatchewan MLAs
Immigrants to the Province of Canada